St Colm's Ballinascreen GAC is a Gaelic Athletic Association club based in Ballinascreen, which includes the town of Draperstown, County Londonderry, Northern Ireland. The club is a member of the Derry GAA. It currently caters for Gaelic football, hurling, camogie and ladies' Gaelic football and have 25 teams across the four sports.

Underage teams up to U-12's play in the south Derry GAA league and championships, from U-14 upwards teams compete in All-Derry competitions.

History
St Colm's GAC Ballinascreen was founded in 1933.  The founders were Seán Mac Diarmada, James Conway, Barney Rodgers and Eddie O'Neill and Michael Kelly. St Colm's started off impressively by winning their first two Derry Senior Football Championships in 1934 and 1935. They followed this with two Derry Senior Hurling Championships in 1938 and 1939. They added a third football championship in 1941. Matt Regan played in all five championship successes. He was a regular on the Derry county team and was the first Derry man to play for Ulster in the Railway Cup.

Ballinascreen opened Dean McGlinchey Park in 1954. A covered stand was added in 1970. They won the 1954 Derry Junior Football Championship. The club won a further Senior Football Championship in 1973, beating Bellaghy in the final.

St Colm's have won eight Ulster Scór titles and one All-Ireland title, the best performance of any club in the county.

In the centenary year for Derry (1984), St. Colm's won the Og Sport award and the AIB Club of the Year award.

Football
Ballinascreen have played senior football for the majority of their existence in Derry. In 2007 the club was relegated to Division Two, though they still played in the senior championship. In the following season, the club won promotion back to Division One by winning the Division Two league title. The club have won four Derry Senior Football Championships, with their last title coming in 1973.  For a number of years Ballinascreen also competed in the pre-season Ulster League competition, winning the cup in 2009.
Ballinascreen have won 9 Minor titles (second on the list behind Bellaghy), with the last coming in 2017.  That year they also made it to the Ulster Minor Club Final.

2020 Championship Football

2019 Championship Football

2018 Championship Football

2017 Championship Football

2017 Championship Football

Hurling
Ballinascreen have claimed the Derry Senior Hurling Championship on three occasions (1887, 1938 and 1939).

Ballinascreen have won the hurling league in 2005 and played in a county hurling final in 2003.

Dean McGlinchey Park
The club's home ground is Dean McGlinchey Park. It has also hosted Derry inter-county games since the 1950s. Since the 1990s Celtic Park in Derry City has become officially recognised as Derry's main county ground, but Dean McGlinchey Park has still hosted a number of National League and Dr. McKenna Cup games in recent years.

In the last 30 years many improvements have been made to the club grounds, including: a club house, full sized floodlit pitch (named after former Chairman, James McNally) and most recently a fully equipped gym.

Honours
Amongst Ballinascreen's honours, they have won the Derry Senior Club Football Championship four times (1934, 1935, 1941 and 1973). They won 2 provincial titles by winning the Ulster League in 2009 and 2022.  They have claimed the Derry Senior Club Hurling Championship on three occasions (1887, 1938 and 1939).
U-16 Derry County Champions 2006
Minor Derry football County Champions 2005
Minor County hurling champions 1989, 1995, 2007, 2008 and 2009
Ulster Minor Hurling Champions 2008 and 2009
All Ireland Feile Na nGael Winners 1996,2003, 2004,

Gaelic football

Senior
Ulster Leagues: 2
2009, 2022
Derry Senior Football Championships: 4
1934, 1935, 1941, 1973
Derry Senior Football League Div 1: 3
1972, 1994, 2011
Derry Senior Football League Div 2: 1
2008
Derry Intermediate Football Championships: 1
1973 (won by Ballinascreen Thirds)
 Derry Junior Football Championships: 3
1954, 1984, 1989
Derry Junior Football Leagues: 3
1977, 1979 (Ballinascreen B), 1991 (won by Ballinascreen Thirds)
McGlinchey Cup 1
2005

Reserves
Derry Reserve Football Championships: 1
2000.

Minor
Derry Minor Football Championships: 9
1958, 1960, 1964, 1966, 1967, 1968, 1978, 2005, 2017

Under-16
 Derry Under-16 Football Championships: 5
 1968, 1976, 1985, 1995, 2006.
 Derry Under-16 Football Leagues: 4
 1967,1968,1985, 1995.
 South Derry Under-16 Football Championships: 6
 1967,1968, 1976, 1985, 1995, 2006.

Under-15 Age Groups New 2021
 Derry Under-15 Football Championships: 2
 2021, 2022
 Derry Under-15 Feile na nOg Titles:  1
 2022
 Derry Under-15 Football League Titles:  1
 2022

Under-14 changed to U-15 2021
 Derry Under-14 Football Championships: 3
 1974, 1983, 2020
 South Derry Under-14 Football Championships: 1
 2004.

Note: The above lists may be incomplete. Please add any other honours you know of.

Hurling

Senior

 Derry Senior Hurling Championship 3
 1887, 1938, 1939
 Derry Senior Hurling League Div 1 2 
 1989, 2005

Reserves
Derry Reserve Hurling Championship 4
 2004, 2005, 2009, 2018
 Derry Senior Hurling League Div 1 Winners 1 
 2014
 Derry Senior Hurling League Div 2 Winners 3 
 2003, 2005, 2008

Minor

Ulster Minor Club Hurling Championships: 2
2008, 2009
Derry County Championships: 8
1986, 1987, 1989, 1995, 2007, 2008, 2009,2020
Derry Minor Hurling league 11
1983, 1985, 1986, 1989, 1992, 1995, 2004, 2005, 2007, 2008, 2009
South Derry Championship 10
1981, 1983, 1985, 1986, 1987, 1989, 1991, 1992, 1995 1998

Under-16

 Derry Under-16 Hurling Championships: 12
 1982, 1986, 1987, 1989, 1993, 1994, 1995, 1996, 1997, 2003, 2006 2015,2017, 2018, 2019
 Derry Under-16 Hurling League 13
 1982, 1984, 1986, 1989, 1993, 1994, 1995, 1996, 1997 2001, 2003, 2006, 2007

Under-15 - Age Group Changed in 2021

 Derry Under-15 Hurling Championships: 1
 2021
 Derry Under-15 Hurling League 1
 2021

Under-14

Derry County Feile na gaels: 12,
 1994, 1996, 2001, 2003, 2004, 2005, 2008, 2011, 2015, 2016, 2017, 2018
Derry Under-14 Hurling Championships: 12,
 1994, 1996, 1997, 2000, 2001, 2003, 2004, 2005,2015, 2016, 2017, 2018
Derry Under-14 Hurling Leagues: 10,
1984, 1988, 1992, 1994, 1996, 2000, 2001, 2003, 2004, 2005,2015
Ulster Div 1 Champions: 2,
 2003, 2004
All Ireland Div 3 Champions: 2,
 1996, 2003,
All Ireland Div 2 Champions: 1,
 2004

Camogie

Under-16
U16 Camogie Derry Championships: 1
 2020

Under-14
U14 Camogie All Ireland Feile na nGael: 2
 2003, 2007. Runners up 2006
Division 1 Cup Semi finalists
 2011

A lot of missing information regarding camogie

Ladies Football

Senior
Derry Senior Championship
2018, 2019

Well known Players
Tony Scullion - 1 All-Ireland Senior Football Championship (1993) 2 Ulster Senior Football Championships (1987 1993) 3 National Football Leagues (1992 1995 1996—Captain 1995) 6 Railway cup medals playing for Ulster (1989 1991 1992 1993 1994 1995—Captain 1991) Played for Ireland in 2 International Rules Series V Australia(1987 & 1990) 4 All-Star Awards(1987 1992 1993 1995)
Éamonn Burns - 1 All-Ireland Senior Football Championship 1993, 2 Ulster Senior Football Championships, 1 All-Ireland Minor Football Championship, 4 National Football Leagues.
 Carlus McWilliams - Current Derry footballer
 Benny Heron - Current Derry footballer
 Conor Murray- Captain, Derry Senior Hurling Team that won Ulster Championship in 2000 also played for Ulster in Railway cup

See also
Derry Senior Football Championship
Derry Senior Hurling Championship
List of Gaelic games clubs in Derry

External links
St Colm's GAC Ballinascreen Website

References

Gaelic games clubs in County Londonderry
Gaelic football clubs in County Londonderry
Hurling clubs in County Londonderry